Balabit was a Hungarian security firm specializing in the development of IT security systems and related services that help businesses reduce the risk of data breaches associated with privileged accounts.

Balabit claims to have more than 1,000,000 corporate users worldwide. The company operates globally with offices across the United States and Europe, together with network of reseller partners.

In January 2018, Balabit was acquired by One Identity, a U.S.-based provider of identity and access management solutions.

History
Balabit was founded in 2000 by 6 private individuals including Zoltán Györkő (CEO), Balázs Scheidler (SVP Engineering) and Endre Wagner (SVP Services).

The company's first technology iteration was Zorp, an advanced application layer firewall suite.

After becoming the leading firewall solution in Hungary in 2004 according to IDC, Balabit started to develop additional product portfolios.

In January 2018, Balabit was acquired by One Identity, a U.S.-based provider of identity and access management solutions. The acquisition included all assets, including privileged access management-related solutions, such as privileged session and privilege analytics products, as well as the company's syslog-ng log management solutions.

Log management 
1998 syslog-ng Open Source Edition (OSE)

2007 syslog-ng Premium Edition (PE)

2008 syslog-ng Store Box (SSB)

Privileged Access Management 
2006 Balabit's Privileged Session Management (formally known as Shell Control Box)

2015 Balabit's Privileged Account Analytics (formally known as Blindspotter)

References

Software companies of Hungary
Companies based in Budapest
Companies established in 2000
Science and technology in Hungary
Hungarian brands